Rhodnius is a genus of assassin bugs in the subfamily Triatominae (the kissing bugs), and is an important vector in the spread of Chagas disease. The Rhodnius species were important models for Sir Vincent Wigglesworth's studies of insect physiology, specifically growth and development.

Species
Rhodnius amazonicus Almeida, Santos & Sposina, 1973
Rhodnius brethesi Matta, 1919 (Tc)
Rhodnius colombiensis Moreno Mejía, Galvão & Jurberg, 1999
Rhodnius dalessandroi Carcavallo & Barreto, 1976
Rhodnius domesticus Neiva & Pinto, 1923 (Tc)
Rhodnius ecuadoriensis Lent & León, 1958 (Tc)
Rhodnius milesi Carcavallo, Rocha, Galvão, Jurberg, 2001
Rhodnius nasutus Stål, 1859 (Tc)
Rhodnius neglectus Lent, 1954 (Tc)
Rhodnius neivai Lent, 1953
Rhodnius pallescens Barber, 1932 (Tc) (principal vector in Panama).
Rhodnius paraensis Sherlock, Guitton & Miles, 1977 (Tc)
Rhodnius pictipes Stål, 1872 (Tc)
Rhodnius prolixus Stål, 1859 (Tc) (principal vector in Colombia and Venezuela, and in Guatemala, Honduras and some parts of Nicaragua and El Salvador). 
Rhodnius robustus Larrousse, 1927 (Tc)
Rhodnius stali Lent, Jurberg & Galvão, 1993 (Tc)

Species marked with (Tc) are associated with Trypanosoma cruzi

References

External links
Summary of Rhodnius species from metapathogen.com

Reduviidae
Taxa named by Carl Stål
Cimicomorpha genera